Revel is the first official release by the Pat McGee Band, released in 1997.

Track listing
"Passion"  – 4:21
"Straight Curve"  – 5:27
"Rebecca"  – 4:46
"Flooding Both of Us"  – 6:51
"Can't Miss What You Never Had"  – 4:27
"All Around Us" –  6:23
"Ceamelodic"  – 4:36
"On Your Way Out of Here" –  5:33
"Eligy for Amy"  – 4:26

Personnel
The Pat McGee Band
Pat McGee – lead vocals, guitars
Al Walsh – guitars, backup vocals
Jonathan Williams – piano, backup vocals
Chris Williams – drums
Chardy McEwan – percussion
John Small – bass
Ira Gitlin – banjo
J.C. Kuhl – saxophone
Juli Murphy – backup vocals
Gali Sanchez – percussion

References

1997 albums
Pat McGee Band albums